Amor libre (English language: Free Love) is a 1969 Argentine romantic comedy film directed by Fernando Siro with a script by Norberto Aroldi.

Release
The film was premièred in Argentina on 22 May 1969.

Cast
 Juan Carlos Altavista ....  Rubén
 Alberto Argibay ....  Mario
 Elena Cruz ....  Elba
 Zulma Faiad ....  Queca
 María Esther Gamas ....  Doña Catalina
 Gilda Lousek ....  Julia
 Fernando Siro
 Enzo Viena ....  Juan
 Tino Pascali
 Jacques Arndt
 Rafael Chumbito
 Felice D'Amore
 Lucio Deval
 Blanca Lagrotta
 Carlos Lagrotta

External links 
 

1969 films
1960s Spanish-language films
1969 romantic comedy films
Argentine romantic comedy films
1960s Argentine films